Miracatu is a municipality in the state of São Paulo in Brazil. The population is 19,643 (2020 est.) in an area of 1001 km². The elevation is 27 m.

The municipality contains part of the  Serra do Mar Environmental Protection Area, created in 1984.
It contains a small part of the  Juréia-Itatins Ecological Station, a strictly protected area of well-preserved Atlantic Forest created in 1986.

References

Municipalities in São Paulo (state)